Highmoor  may refer to:

Places

England
Highmoor, Cumbria
Highmoor, Oxfordshire

Northern Ireland
Highmoor, County Londonderry, a townland in County Londonderry, Northern Ireland

People
Highmoor (family)

See also
Highmore